Bromsgrove Rugby Football Club is an English rugby union football club based in Bromsgrove, Worcestershire. The club currently plays in the fifth tier of the English rugby union system, Midlands Premier, following their promotion from Midlands 1 West as champions (and via level-transfer) at the end of the 2018–19 season.  The club runs four senior sides and a full range of junior sides.

Honours
 North Midlands Cup winners (3): 1981–82, 2000–01, 2009–10
 North Midlands Cup Plate winners: 2014–15
 Midlands 1 West champions (4): 2001–02, 2003–04, 2008–09, 2018–19
 National League 3 Midlands champions: 2010–11

References

External links
Official website - Broken link
Official Facebook 

English rugby union teams
Rugby clubs established in 1872
1872 establishments in England
Rugby union in Worcestershire
Bromsgrove